The 2013–14 French Basketball Cup season was the 37rd season of the domestic cup competition of French basketball. The defending champions were Paris-Levallois Basket. JSF Nanterre won the Cup after it beat SLUC Nancy 55–50 in the Final. Trenton Meacham was named the French Basketball Cup Final MVP.

Final

References

French Basketball Cup
Cup